Viliami Lutua (born circa 1956) is a Tongan former rugby union prop.

Career
Lutua debuted for Tonga on 8 August 1981, against Fiji, in Nuku'alofa. He was also part of the 1987 Rugby World Cup 'Ikale Tahi squad, playing the pool stage matches against Wales and Ireland in the tournament. His final cap for Tonga was on 8 October 1988, against Fiji, in Nadi. Currently, Lutui is a Tonga Rugby Union board member.

References

External links

1958 births
Living people
People from Tongatapu
Tongan rugby union players
Rugby union props
Tonga international rugby union players